Shearing is a surname. Notable people with the surname include:

Dinah Shearing (1928–2021), Australian actress
George Shearing (1919–2011), British jazz pianist
Miriam Shearing (born 1935), American lawyer and judge
Peter Shearing (born 1938), English footballer

See also
Sherring